Drake University is a private university in Des Moines, Iowa. It offers undergraduate and graduate programs, including professional programs in business, law, and pharmacy. Drake's law school is among the 25 oldest in the United States.

History

Drake University was founded in 1881 by George T. Carpenter, a teacher and pastor, and Francis Marion Drake, a Union general during the Civil War. Drake was originally affiliated with the Christian Church (Disciples of Christ), although no religious affiliation is officially recognized today. The first classes convened in 1881, with 77 students and one building constructed, Student's Home.

In 1883, the first permanent building, Old Main, was completed. Old Main remains prominent on campus, housing administration offices, Levitt Hall, and Sheslow Auditorium, and as the site of many United States presidential debates, and other events. The university's law school–the second oldest law school in the country west of the Mississippi River, after Saint Louis University School of Law–was established in 1865, by Chester C. Cole, who served on the Iowa Supreme Court from 1864 to 1876. Drake's first international students enrolled for classes in 1886, and were citizens of China, Persia, Armenia, and Japan. The first campus library opened on June 16, 1908. In 1920, due to a housing crisis, the university allowed social fraternities to use Greek letter emblems and affiliate with national offices.

Drake's law school, one of the 25 oldest law schools in the nation, traces its history to 1865. It is a charter member of the Association of American Law Schools; has been accredited since 1923, when accreditation began; and is one of only 75 ABA-approved law schools with a chapter of the Order of the Coif. Drake University Law School is home to the American Judicature Society; the archives of the National Bar Association, the nation's oldest and largest national association of predominately African-American lawyers and judges; and the Drake Constitutional Law Center, one of only four constitutional law programs established by the U.S. Congress and funded by the federal government.

In 1887, the Iowa College of Pharmacy affiliated with Drake University and operated as one of the colleges of the university, until 1906, when it was discontinued. Drake was without a pharmacy school until 1939, when the Des Moines College of Pharmacy Corporation, which separated from Des Moines University in 1927, was dissolved and the college's staff and facilities became part of Drake University.

In 1931, the women's dormitory opened—the first on-campus student residence built since the university's founding. In 1937, ground was broken on commencement day for Cowles Library, now the university's primary library. In 1939, a new men's dormitory was completed, which included a student union, dubbed "The Kennel". In 1963, Kirk Residence Hall opened, then Meredith Hall opened, in 1965, opening the door for the College of Liberal Arts and the School of Journalism. During the height of nationwide student protests in 1970–culminating in the Student Strike of 1970–a bomb exploded inside Harvey Ingham Hall. No one was injured, but windows were shattered in nearby Meredith, Fitch and Herriott Halls. Ingham was decimated, but repaired. The largest building on campus, the Harmon Fine Arts Center, opened in 1972. The Olmsted Center, Drake's student union building, opened in 1974.

On September 17, 1969, the Drake student newspaper, The Times-Delphic, published what appears to be the first documented account of the Paul is dead hoax. No articles published prior to this piece about the supposed death of Paul McCartney are evidenced, although fellow Times-Delphic reporter and musician Dartanyan Brown, one of the sources for the article, recalled hearing about the hoax from other musicians and reading about it in some underground newspapers.

In 1992, the Knapp Center opened as home to the men's and women's basketball teams, and the women's volleyball team. It contains four racquetball courts, five basketball and volleyball courts, a 200-meter track, and a weight training center. The facility hosted President Bill Clinton in 1996.

In September 2010, Drake launched the distinctlyDrake Campaign to support its successful $200 million capital fundraising campaign to become "one of the nation’s very best institutions of higher learning."

In 2013, Drake University became the home of The Harkin Institute for Public Policy & Citizen Engagement.

Academics

The university consists of seven colleges and schools:

 College of Arts and Sciences
 John Dee Bright College
 School of Education
 School of Journalism and Mass Communication
 Law School
 College of Pharmacy and Health Sciences
 Zimpleman College of Business

Student life
Drake features over 160 student organizations, which including several fraternities and sororities.

The School of Journalism and Mass Communication (SJMC) magazine program has achieved national prominence. The Accrediting Council on Education in Journalism and Mass Communication (ACEJMC) team that visited in 1999 termed Drake's Magazines program the strongest undergraduate sequence in the country. In 2007, Drake student magazines THiNK and 515 won Pacemaker Awards.

Athletics

Drake student-athletes compete in NCAA Division I in the Missouri Valley Conference in all sports except football, men's tennis and women's rowing. In football, Drake competes in the FCS NCAA Division I Pioneer Football League. In women's rowing, Drake competes in the Metro Atlantic Athletic Conference. In men's tennis, Drake competes in the Summit League.

Basketball (men's and women's)
Crew (women's)
Cross-country (men's and women's)
Football (men's)
Golf (men's and women's)
Soccer (men's and women's)
Softball (women's)
Tennis (men's and women's)
Track & Field (men's and women's)
Volleyball (women's)

History
In 1885, baseball became the university's first varsity sport, followed by football and track.

In 1904, Drake organized a women's basketball team, but Mary Carpenter, the first Dean of Women, banned the team as "not appropriate" for women.

Also in 1904, the athletic teams received their nickname of Bulldogs from a sportswriter who noticed that John L. Griffith, who coached every sport, was bringing his pet bulldogs to the practice fields. The teams had previously been known as the Ducklings and Ganders.

On October 11, 1905, Drake's first football field, Haskins Field, opened with a 17–0 loss to Iowa.

In 1928, Drake's football history continued when Drake defeated Simpson College 41–6 in what is believed to be the first night football game west of the Mississippi River. Perhaps the most famous incident in Drake's football history is known as the Johnny Bright Incident, where Pulitzer Prize-winning photographs in the Des Moines Register proved an intentional attack on the African American quarterback by Oklahoma A&M football players (Oklahoma A&M became Oklahoma State in 1957).

In 1969, Drake's men's basketball team reached the Final Four of the NCAA Tournament. Top-seeded UCLA Bruins men's basketball and its 7-foot megastar Lew Alcindor (later Kareem Abdul-Jabbar) barely escaped an upset in the national semifinals, 85–82.

In 1973, nearly 70 years after the original women's basketball team had been banned, Drake established a department of Women's Intercollegiate Athletics.

In 1981, senior Lewis Lloyd, the nation's second-leading scorer in Division I men's basketball, was named a first-team All-American. Drafted by the Houston Rockets, Lloyd went on to an eight-year NBA career.

In 1982, the first year of the NCAA women's basketball tournament, Drake came within one step of the Final Four.

Drake Relays

Drake's most famous event, the Drake Relays, began in 1910 in a blizzard with fewer than 100 participants. In 1935 Jesse Owens set an American broad jump record (26 feet 1-3/4 inches) at the Drake Relays. Today, the Drake Relays draws athletes from all over the world, including Olympians. It is common to see Relays participants compete in the Summer Olympics and vice versa.  Students kick-off the Relays in the annual tradition of street painting, in which student organizations colorfully decorate areas of Carpenter Avenue near the center of campus under a common theme.

Notable people

See also
Drake University Campus Historic District, listed on the National Register of Historic Places
Vote Smart
620 Drakonia

References

External links

Official website
Drake Athletics website
Drake's student newspaper The Times-Delphic website

 
Educational institutions established in 1881
Tourist attractions in Des Moines, Iowa
Buildings and structures in Des Moines, Iowa
Drake University
Business schools in Iowa
Private universities and colleges in Iowa